"Violet" is an Italian fairy tale by Giambattista Basile. It appears in the Pentamerone (The Tales of tales), first published in the 1630s.

References

Italian fairy tales
1630s works